Boyle is a village in northern Alberta, Canada within Athabasca County.

Boyle is named after former Alberta Minister of Education, Justice John Robert Boyle (1871–1936), and founded in 1916.

Demographics 

In the 2016 Census of Population conducted by Statistics Canada, the Village of Boyle recorded a population of 845 living in 357 of its 464 total private dwellings, a  change from its 2011 population of 916.

The population of the Village of Boyle according to its 2014 municipal census is 948, a  change from its 2009 municipal census population of 918.

Notable people 
Tim Hague - Mixed martial artist
Bryan Mudryk - sports broadcaster

See also 
List of communities in Alberta
List of villages in Alberta

References

External links 

1916 establishments in Alberta
Villages in Alberta
Populated places established in 1953